Topno is an Indian surname. Notable people with the surname include:

 Frida Topno (1925–2018), Indian politician
 Manohar Topno (born 1958), Indian field hockey player 
 Rajeev Topno (born 1974), Indian civil servant 

Indian surnames